Ortaköy District is a district of Aksaray Province of Turkey. Its seat is the town Ortaköy. Its area is 727 km2, and its population is 32,130 (2021). It is a rural district centred on the small, quiet town of Ortaköy.

Composition
There is one municipality in Ortaköy District:
 Ortaköy

There are 30 villages in Ortaköy District:

 Akpınar
 Bozkır
 Camuzluk
 Çatin
 Ceceli
 Çiftevi
 Cumali
 Devedamı
 Durhasanlı
 Gökkaya
 Gökler
 Hacıibrahimuşağı
 Hacımahmutuşağı
 Harmandalı
 Hıdırlı
 Hocabeyli
 Karapınar
 Kümbet
 Namlıkışla
 Oğuzlar
 Ozancık
 Pınarbaşı
 Pirli
 Reşadiye
 Salarıalaca
 Salarıgödeler
 Sarıkaraman
 Satansarı
 Seksenuşağı
 Yıldırımlar

References

Districts of Aksaray Province